Marsh Run is a 4.0-mile (6.4 km) long tributary to Oil Creek in Crawford County, Pennsylvania.

References

Additional Maps

Rivers of Pennsylvania
Rivers of Crawford County, Pennsylvania